Robert Yate (25 April 1643 - 27 October 1737) was an English non-partisan politician and Member of Parliament of Great Britain for Bristol from 1695 - 1710.

Parliamentary career 
Yate supported re-establishing the African Company of Merchants.

Death 
Yate died in Charlton, Bristol on 27 October 1737, with his burial taking place at Christ Church, Bristol due to his status as a former alderman. He left the majority of his estate to his two nephews.

Personal life 
He had a cousin - Joseph Earle - who also served as an MP for Bristol directly after Yate.

References 

1643 births
1737 deaths
English merchants
Members of the Parliament of Great Britain for Bristol